Lophocalama is a genus of moths of the family Noctuidae.

Species
 Lophocalama neuritis Hampson, 1910
 Lophocalama suffusa (Lucas, 1894)

References
Natural History Museum Lepidoptera genus database
Lophocalama at funet

Hadeninae